Mr. Reckless is a 1948 American adventure film directed by Frank McDonald.

Cast 
William Eythe as Jeff Lundy
Barbara Britton as Betty Denton
Walter Catlett as Joel Hawkins
Minna Gombell as Ma Hawkins
Lloyd Corrigan as Hugo Denton
Nestor Paiva as Gus
Frank Jenks as Cab Driver
Ian MacDonald as Jim Halsey
James Millican as Pete

Production
Pine Thomas Productions purchased the story from Thomas Ahearn in 1946 and hired him to write the script.

References

External links 

1948 films
1948 adventure films
1940s English-language films
American black-and-white films
Films directed by Frank McDonald
American adventure films
1940s American films